The Hardy Bucks Movie is a 2013 Irish comedy film based on the RTÉ Two sitcom Hardy Bucks, directed by Mike Cockayne. The film follows the characters from the TV series, a group of Irish slackers who travel to Poland to follow the Republic of Ireland team at UEFA Euro 2012. It stars Martin Maloney, Chris Tordoff, Owen Colgan, Peter Cassidy and Tom Kilgallon. The Hardy Bucks Movie was released on 13 February 2013 to favourable reviews, and was a box office success in Ireland.

Plot
The "Hardy Bucks" gang travel to Poland to see the Republic of Ireland team compete at UEFA Euro 2012. Along the journey they encounter Dutch gangsters & Prostitutes.

Release

Box office
The Hardy Bucks Movie was a box-office success in Ireland, grossing €176,887 on its opening weekend and earning €500,000 in total, much more than its €320,000 budget.

Critical reception
The Hardy Bucks Movie was well received by most critics. Joe.ie observed "While the TV series was certainly funny, there was a certain air of censorship that comes with having a show with the national broadcaster. Thankfully, the movie has edges far sharper than its TV incarnation."

See also

List of Irish films

References

External links
 
 

2013 films
2013 comedy films
Irish comedy films
2013 independent films
English-language Irish films
Films based on television series
Films shot in Poland
Irish independent films
2010s English-language films